"Indian giver" is a pejorative expression used to describe a person who gives a "gift" and later wants it back or who expects something of equivalent worth in return for the item. It is based on cultural misunderstandings that took place between the early European colonists and the Indigenous people with whom they traded. Often, the Europeans viewed an exchange of items as gifts and believed that they owed nothing in return to the Indigenous people. On the other hand, the Indigenous people saw the exchange as a form of trade or equal exchange and so they had differing expectations of their guests.

The phrase is used to describe a negative act or shady business dealings. It is considered disrespectful, and its use is offensive to many Indigenous people.

Etymology
The phrase originated, according to the researcher David Wilton, in a cultural misunderstanding that arose when European settlers first encountered Native Americans after the former had arrived in North America in the 15th century. The Europeans thought that they were receiving gifts from Native Americans, but the Native Americans believed that they were engaging in what was known to Europeans as bartering. That resulted in the Native Americans finding European behaviour ungenerous and insulting.

Usage
The phrase was first noted in 1765 by Thomas Hutchinson, who characterized an Indian gift as "a present for which an equivalent return is expected," which suggests that the phrase originally referred to a simple exchange of gifts. In 1860, however, in John Russell Bartlett's Dictionary of Americanisms, Bartlett said that the phrase was being used by children in New York to mean "one who gives a present and then takes it back." 

In 1969, American bubblegum pop band 1910 Fruitgum Company published the album Indian Giver. The titular song peaked at #5 on the Billboard Hot 100, and #1 in Canada.

As recently as 1979, the phrase was used in mainstream media publications, but in the 1997 book The Color of Words: An Encyclopaedic Dictionary of Ethnic Bias in the United States, the writer and editor Philip H. Herbst says that although the phrase is often used innocently by children, it may be interpreted as offensive, and The Copyeditor's Handbook (1999) describes it as objectionable.

See also

 Competitive altruism
 Ethnic slurs
 Indian summer
 Potlatch
 Reciprocity

References

American English idioms
Ethnic and religious slurs
Indigenous peoples in the United States